Mandaragiri or Basadi-betta is a Jain pilgrimage located on Mandaragiri Hill in Tumkur district in the Indian state of Karnataka.

About temple 
The Mandaragiri temple complex is an important Jain pilgrimage centre named after Mallinatha. The hilltop has four twelfth-century temples and one stupa enclosed in a massive stone wall with paintings of Tirthankaras. The back wall, the original entrance of the temple, features an entrance gate with two pillars bearing carvings of elephants and an image of Tirthankara seated on a lotus pedestal. The first temple doesn't enshrine any idols and the remaining three temples are dedicated to Chandraprabha, Parshvanatha and Suparshvanatha. The stupa houses one stone slab with a carving of a footprint. The temple complex also includes a large manastambha.

On the foot of the hill, a  temple called Guru mandir dedicated to Jain Acharya Shantisagar is located. This temple is popularly known as pinchi temple and peacock temple due to the temple structure resembling a pinchi, peacock feather fan, used by Digambara monks. A  monolithic statue of Chandraprabha is located near Guru mandir.

Maidala Kere and Padmavati Kere are the two lakes located near the temple complex on the hilltop. There is a ruined temple housing a large stone-carved image of a Tirthankara near Maidala lake. There are eight idols of goddesses scattered near the Padmavati Kere.

See also 
 Shravanabelagola
 Aagam Mandir, Tumkur

References

Citations

Sources

External links

Jain temples in Karnataka
12th-century Jain temples